John Ralston (born October 9, 1964) is a Canadian actor.

Career 
Ralston's most notable roles are George Venturi on Life with Derek, and his role as Mr. Avenir on Strange Days at Blake Holsey High. He was also the lead on the 2010–12 HBO Canada series Living in Your Car.

Earlier in his career, Ralston was seen on the Toronto stage in a production of George F. Walker's Risk Everything in 1998.

In 2006 and 2007, he was featured in Toyota Tundra truck commercials airing in Canada, and starred as Ming the Merciless in the 2007 Sci-Fi Channel original series Flash Gordon. In 2008 he was in the Lifetime movie A Near Death Experience.

In July 2013, Ralston appeared on Degrassi in its 13th season as Miles Hollingsworth II, a role he continued through its 14th and final season. Ralston reprised this role in the follow-up series, Degrassi: Next Class. In 2015, he co-starred as Jean-Claude Van Damme's estranged brother in the film, Pound of Flesh.

Personal life 
Ralston was born in Miramichi, New Brunswick. He grew up in Fredericton and St. Andrews, New Brunswick. He received a Bachelor of Education degree (Literature and Anthropology) from The University of New Brunswick. He became interested in acting while studying for a diploma in jazz studies at St. Francis Xavier University in Nova Scotia.

Ralston lives in Toronto, Canada. He has a son named Stuart, who is best known as the original voice of Rocky from the TV series PAW Patrol and as the second voice of O the Owl on Daniel Tiger's Neighborhood.

Filmography

Film

Television

References

External links 

John Ralston at SCIFIpedia

Canadian male film actors
Canadian male television actors
Living people
People from Fredericton
1964 births
Male actors from New Brunswick
Canadian male voice actors
People from Miramichi, New Brunswick
People from Saint Andrews, New Brunswick